"Lonely Boy" is an international hit song from 1977, written and recorded by Andrew Gold in 1976 for his album What's Wrong with This Picture?  It spent five months on the American charts, peaking at number seven in both Canada and the United States, and number 11 in the United Kingdom.  While "Lonely Boy" would be Gold's biggest U.S. hit, his track "Never Let Her Slip Away" achieved greater success in the U.K.

Overview
The song follows the life of a child who feels neglected by his parents after the birth of a younger sister. Many assume this song to be autobiographical, yet Gold denied the implication, despite great similarities between the lyrics and his life.  Regarding the verses' first lines: "He was born on a summer day in 1951" matches Gold's August 2, 1951 birthday, "In the summer of '53 his mother/Brought him a sister" matches his sister Martha's July 22, 1953 birthday, and "He left home on a winter day, 1969" may match the formation of Bryndle, of which Andrew was a member, in 1969.

The second verse of the song features backing vocals provided by Linda Ronstadt.  Gold had previously worked with Ronstadt as a producer and backing musician.

The song was also released as an edited single, eliminating the vocal bridge and shortening the instrumental finale.

It is written in the key of A major with a tempo of 122 BPM.

The song starts with the piano accompaniment, which first seems to be on beat but then when the drums join in, it is exposed to be one half of a beat off.

Personnel
 Andrew Gold – vocals, piano, cowbell, handclaps
 Waddy Wachtel – lead guitar
 Dan Dugmore – rhythm guitar
 Kenny Edwards – bass guitar
 Brock Walsh – electric piano, ARP String Ensemble
 Mike Botts – drums, percussion, sleigh bells
 Linda Ronstadt – backing vocals
 Peter Asher – handclaps

Chart performance

Weekly charts

Year-end charts

Uses in media and cover versions
The song was featured in a number of films including Boogie Nights (1997), The Waterboy (1998), and The Nice Guys (2016). It was the final video to be played on the MTV cable channel's first day of broadcast in the United States, on August 1, 1981. It was also used in "The Pool," an episode of the TV series This Is Us, first broadcast on October 18, 2016, and "Into the Black," an episode of the TV series Animal Kingdom, first broadcast on July 2, 2019. The song's use in Boogie Nights was designated as one of "The 30 Greatest Rock & Roll Movie Moments" by Rolling Stone magazine.

In February 2000, the Foo Fighters recorded a cover of the song to be used as a B-side for an upcoming single off their 1999 album There Is Nothing Left to Lose; however, it wasn't used as a B-side as planned. On Marc Maron's January 17, 2013 WTF podcast, Foo Fighters leader Dave Grohl said that the band's cover of "Lonely Boy" would eventually be released as the A-side of a special "Solid Gold" 45 rpm single with a Foo Fighters version of Gold's "Never Let Her Slip Away" as the B-side.

References

1977 singles
Andrew Gold songs
Songs written by Andrew Gold
1976 songs
Asylum Records singles
Songs about loneliness
Song recordings produced by Peter Asher